The 1986–87 La Liga season, the 56th since its establishment, started on August 30, 1986, and finished on June 21, 1987.

Real Madrid retained the title, but this time finished just a single point ahead of Barcelona compared to 11 points a year earlier. It was the last of three seasons as Barcelona manager for the Englishman Terry Venables before his dismissal, the arrival of British strikers Gary Lineker and Mark Hughes not being enough to save his job or bring the title to Camp Nou.

Teams and locations
It was composed of the following clubs:

Competition format
It was the longest season ever in Spanish football. The league had two phases. In the first one, all 18 teams played each other twice (home and away). At the end of the first phase, the first six teams qualified for the championship group (Group A), the next six qualified for the intermediate group (Group B) and the last six qualified for the relegation group (Group C). In the second phase, teams played only against teams of the same group twice (home and away) and carried their first phase record. The last three in relegation group should have been relegated at the end of the season, but in the middle of the season it was decided that the Primera División and Segunda División would be expanded to 20 teams. In the end, the last three teams of the relegation group played a playoff and only Racing de Santander was relegated.

Regular season

League table

Results

Championship group

League table

Results

Intermediate group

League table

Results

Relegation group

League table

Results

Relegation playoffs

League table

Results

Pichichi Trophy

La Liga seasons
1986–87 in Spanish football leagues
Spain